Pregel may refer to:

Pregolya, a river in the Russian Kaliningrad Oblast exclave
Pregel, a Google large-scale graph processing bulk synchronous parallel extension